The Shire of Meekatharra is a local government area in the Mid West region of Western Australia, about halfway between the town of Port Hedland and the state capital, Perth, Western Australia.

History
The Meekatharra Road District was established on 31 October 1909 out of the abolished Peak Hill Road District and Nannine Road District. It lost much of its territory to a reconstituted Nannine Road District on 7 December 1913, but regained much of that when the Nannine district was abolished for a second and final time on 24 January 1930. It became a shire on 1 July 1961 following the passage of the Local Government Act 1960, which reformed all remaining road districts into shires.

Wards
The shire is divided into three wards:

 Town Ward (five councillors)
 Nannine Ward (two councillors)
 Peak Hill Ward (two councillors)

Towns and localities
The towns and localities of the Shire of Meekatharra with population and size figures based on the most recent Australian census:

Ghost towns
Ghost towns in the Shire of Meekatharra:
 Gabanintha
 Horseshoe
 Nannine
 Peak Hill
 Porlell

Heritage-listed places

As of 2023, 102 places are heritage-listed in the Shire of Meekatharra, of which three are on the State Register of Heritage Places.

References

External links
 

 
Meekatharra